Nicolas Antoine Boulanger (11 November 1722, in Paris – 16 September 1759, in Paris) was a French philosopher and man of letters during the Age of Enlightenment.

Biography 
Born the son of a paper merchant in Paris, Boulanger studied first mathematics, and later ancient languages.  He composed several philosophical works in which he sought to come up with naturalistic explanations for superstitions and religious practices, all of which were published posthumously.  His major works were Research into the Origins of Oriental Despotism («Recherches sur l’origine du despotisme oriental», 1761) and Antiquity Unveiled («L’Antiquité dévoilée par ses usages», 1766). Boulanger's collected works were published in 1792.

The German-born Baron d'Holbach (Paul-Henri Thiry, 1723–1789) published his controversial anti-religious work Christianity Unveiled («Christianisme dévoilé», 1761), using Boulanger's name as his pseudonym, just two years after the philosopher's death. Boulanger also was one of the first modern critics of Paul.

Honours 
The Koronian asteroid 7346 Boulanger, discovered in 1993, was named in his honor.

References

External links 
 

1722 births
1759 deaths
18th-century philosophers
18th-century French writers
18th-century French male writers
Contributors to the Encyclopédie (1751–1772)
Corps des ponts
Enlightenment philosophers
École des Ponts ParisTech alumni
French male non-fiction writers
French philosophers
Philosophes
Writers from Paris